Prvoslav Radojević (1280) was a Serbian nobleman in the service of Queen Helen of Anjou (consort 1245–76; dowager 1276–1314), with the title of kaznac (chamberlain, camerarius). The title-holder was among the foremost at the Serbian court, taking care of state finances. He was a provincial kaznac, as opposed to the royal (statewide) veliki kaznac. Queen Helen was the consort of king Stefan Uroš I (r. 1243–76) and mother of kings Stefan Dragutin (r. 1276–82) and Stefan Milutin (r. 1282–1321). The Queen governed Zeta and Trebinje during the rule of her sons, until 1309. Prvoslav Radojević is mentioned as serving the Queen in Trebinje in a document dated 8 February 1280. This also shows that Queen Helen had her own kaznac in Trebinje. His office was succeeded by Mrnjan, who is known to have held that office between 1288 and 1290 (possibly somewhat earlier).

References

Sources

13th-century Serbian nobility
People of the Kingdom of Serbia (medieval)
Kaznac
13th-century births
Nikšić Municipality
Medieval Montenegro
History of the Serbs of Montenegro
Year of death unknown